Talaititama Talaiti is a Niuean politician and member of the Niue Assembly.

Talaiti is a long-serving member of the Assembly, and has represented the village of Vaiea since being elected unopposed in 1992. Since 2014 he has served as an Assistant Minister, first as Assistant Minister of Infrastructure from 2014 - 2017, then as Assistant Minister of Education from 2017 - 2020. 

Talaiti represented Niue in shooting at the 2006 Commonwealth Games in Melbourne.

References

Living people
Members of the Niue Assembly
Year of birth missing (living people)
Commonwealth Games competitors for Niue
Shooters at the 2006 Commonwealth Games